Kuota is an Italian bicycle brand, owned by Kuota International Co. Ltd, founded in 2001. Their bicycles are distributed in Belgium, Denmark, UK, France, Germany, Italy, Spain, Greece, Canada, Japan, Korea, Taiwan, China, Hong Kong, Malaysia, Thailand, Indonesia and Philippines.

Products

Kuota focuses on carbon fibre reinforced resin (CFR) frames from the beginning, which are produced exclusively in its own manufacturing facilities. The product range includes road, time trial, triathlon, cyclo-cross and mountain bike frames, all made of CFR only.

In 2003 the Khan model was named “Best Bike of the Year” by the French bicycle magazine Le Cycle.

Involvement in cycling and triathlon

Kuota is sponsor of the UCI continental road cycling team Team RothAKROS since the beginning of season 2017. In 2015 Kuota started sponsoring , a UCI women's road cycling team.

For the 2018 and 2019 seasons, Kuota provided bikes for the UCI Pro Continental team Cofidis.

In triathlon, Kuota has been supporting several international athletes, such as two time Ironman world champion Normann Stadler, Andy Böcherer and Andy Potts. Kuota is currently sponsoring the 2016 Challenge Fuerteventura champion and 2016 4th at Ironman Kona Anja Beranek (since 2015), the two time Italian Olympic triathlete and 2016 Ironman Taiwan champion Daniel Fontana (since 2009) and British Triathlon squad member Tom Bishop (since 2017).

See also

 List of bicycle parts
 List of Italian companies

References

External links

 
 AG2R-La Mondiale Cycling Team (In French)
 Team UK Youth Cycling Team

Cycle manufacturers of Italy
Manufacturing companies established in 2001
Italian companies established in 2001
Italian brands